Juan García y Margallo (12 July 1839 – 28 October 1893) was a Spanish governor of Melilla (1891–93) and general who was defeated and killed during the Rif War, which is also called the Margallo War after him. He is the great grandfather of Spanish diplomat and former Minister of Foreign Affairs José Manuel García-Margallo.

References

External links
 Rif War 1893-1894
Wars of the World - The Rif War 1893
 Las Guerras de Marruecos

Spanish generals
Spanish military personnel killed in action
History of Melilla
1893 deaths
19th-century Spanish people
1839 births
Spanish military personnel of the Third Carlist War (Governmental faction)